is a Japanese light novel series, written by Labo Asai and illustrated by Miyagi, who was later replaced by Zain. It switched publishers in 2008 to Shogakukan, who have published twenty-one volumes as of January 2018. A manga adaptation of the original series with art by Yaku Haibara was serialized in Kadokawa's Beans Ace magazine. It was collected in a single tankōbon volume. An anime television series adaptation animated by Seven Arcs Pictures aired from April 5 to June 21, 2018.

Synopsis
A long time ago, dragons were the only creatures capable of wielding magic, which they used to terrorize humanity, until humanity learned to channel magic through special formulas and spells called "jushiiki". Those capable of using jushiiki became known as jushikiists, and became crucial in fighting dragons throughout the years, until a peace treaty was enforced to prevent both races from wiping each other out. In the modern day, Gayus and Gigina are two jushikiists who take special jobs from a variety of clients in the city of Eridana.

Characters

A deductive and intellectual jushiikist who constantly worries about his financial state and his relationship with his girlfriend Jivunya. He lost his sister Aleciel when he was younger, which motivated his jushiikist training.

Gayus' partner and a jushiikist hailing from the Drake culture, which emphasizes glory and honor in battle. Gigina enjoys fighting and spending money in frivolous things, such as excessive furniture, which frustrates Gayus to no end.

Gayus' girlfriend. An Arlian born amongst humans, she has blonde hair, and fair skin. She constantly worries for Gayus, especially whenever he gets injured.

The mate of Eningiluud, the black dragon Gayus and Gigina kill on a mission. Seeking revenge on her mate's killers, she assumes a human form and kills several jushikiists across Eridana and eventually confronts Gayus and Gigina, who barely manage to kill her.

A high-ranking politician dedicated to maintaining peace between humans and dragons, which leads him to use pragmatic and ruthless methods to uphold said peace.

An androgynous jushiikist working as one of Mordin's generals.

One of Mordin's generals and Berdrit's older brother.

One of Mordin's generals and Jesper's younger brother.

A journalist and acquaintance of Gayus.

Media

Light novel

Manga

Anime
An anime television series adaptation animated by Seven Arcs Pictures was originally scheduled to air starting on October 5, 2017 on TBS. However, due to production issues, the anime's premiere was delayed until April 5, 2018 on TBS, and later on April 14, 2018 on BS-TBS. Hiroshi Nishikori serves as chief director of the series, Hirokazu Hanai directing the series, with Takayo Ikami in charge of series composition and Masaru Kitao designed the characters. fripSide performed the opening theme song "divine criminal", and Maon Kurosaki performed the ending theme song . The series ran for 12 episodes. Crunchyroll streamed the series.

Notes

References

External links
  
  
 

2003 Japanese novels
2008 Japanese novels
Anime and manga based on light novels
Dark fantasy anime and manga
Funimation
Gagaga Bunko
Kadokawa Shoten manga
Kadokawa Sneaker Bunko
Shogakukan franchises
Light novels
NBCUniversal Entertainment Japan
Seven Arcs
Shōnen manga
TBS Television (Japan) original programming